Chris Knowles (born 4 February 1978) is an English footballer, who played as a goalkeeper in the Football League for Chester City.

References

Chester City F.C. players
Peterborough United F.C. players
Witton Albion F.C. players
Association football goalkeepers
English Football League players
1978 births
Living people
People from Stone, Staffordshire
English footballers